Marston Jabbet is a hamlet near Bulkington, Warwickshire, England. In the Imperial Gazetteer of England and Wales of 1870-72 Marston Jabbett had a population of 93.

Location 
The hamlet is located about 1 mile northeast of Bulkington and 1.4 miles northeast of the city centre of Bedworth. Nuneaton is 2.4 miles to the north and Coventry is 7 miles to the south. The Ashby Canal passes through the northern part of the area.

History 
Marston Jabbet was recorded in the Domesday Book as Merstone, having 21 households with 12 villagers, 8 smallholders and 1 female slave. William Perkins, Puritan theologian and prolific religious author, was born in Marston Jabbet in 1558.

References 

Villages in Warwickshire
Bedworth